Aragea mizunoi is a species of beetle in the family Cerambycidae, and the only species in the genus Aragea. It was described by Hayash in 1953.

References

Desmiphorini
Beetles described in 1953
Monotypic Cerambycidae genera